A canal basin is (particularly in the United Kingdom) an expanse of waterway alongside or at the end of a canal, and wider than the canal, constructed to allow boats to moor or unload cargo without impeding the progress of other traffic, and to allow room for turning, thus serving as a winding hole. For inland waterways, a basin may be thought of as a land-locked harbour.

A basin was often associated with wharves around its perimeter, to support commercial users. In modern times, canal basins are more usually used to moor residential and recreational  narrowboats.

Gallery

See also

List of canal basins in the United Kingdom
Turning basin

References

Water transport infrastructure